Matilda of Brabant (14 June 1224 – 29 September 1288) was the eldest daughter of Henry II, Duke of Brabant and his first wife Marie of Hohenstaufen.

Marriages and children
On 14 June 1237, which was her 13th birthday, Matilda married her first husband Robert I of Artois. Robert was the son of Louis VIII of France and Blanche of Castile. They had:

Blanche of Artois (1248 – 2 May 1302). Married first Henry I of Navarre and secondly Edmund Crouchback, 1st Earl of Lancaster.
Robert II, Count of Artois (1250 – 11 July 1302 at the Battle of the Golden Spurs).

On 8 February 1250, Robert I was killed while participating in the Seventh Crusade.  On 16 January 1255, Matilda married her second husband Guy III, Count of Saint-Pol. He was a younger son of Hugh I, Count of Blois and Mary, Countess of Blois. They had:

Hugh II, Count of Blois (died 1307), Count of Saint Pol and later Count of Blois
Guy IV, Count of Saint-Pol (died 1317), Count of Saint Pol
Jacques I of Leuze-Châtillon (died 11 July 1302 at the Battle of the Golden Spurs), first of the lords of Leuze, married Catherine de Condé and had issue; his descendants brought Condé, Carency, etc. into the House of Bourbon.
Beatrix (died 1304), married John I of Brienne, Count of Eu
Jeanne, married Guillaume III de Chauvigny, Lord of Châteauroux
Gertrude, married Florent, Lord of Mechelen (French: Malines).

References

Sources

External links
Her profile, along with her father, in "Medieval Lands" by Charles Cawley

1224 births
1288 deaths
House of Reginar
Countesses of Artois
13th-century French women
13th-century French nobility
13th-century German women
13th-century German nobility
Christians of the Sixth Crusade